Goniophlebium is a genus of ferns in the family Polypodiaceae, subfamily Microsoroideae, according to the Pteridophyte Phylogeny Group classification of 2016 (PPG I).

Taxonomy
A molecular phylogenetic study in 2019 suggested that Goniophlebium was sister to the rest of the subfamily Microsoroideae:

Species
The Pteridophyte Phylogeny Group classification of 2016 (PPG I) states that the genus has 25 species. , Plants of the World Online accepted 26 species:
Goniophlebium amoenum (Wall. ex Mett.) Bedd.
Goniophlebium argutum J.Sm.
Goniophlebium benguetense (Copel.) Copel.
Goniophlebium bourretii (C.Chr. & Tardieu) X.C.Zhang
Goniophlebium chinense (Christ) X.C.Zhang
Goniophlebium coadunatum Barcelona & M.G.Price
Goniophlebium demersum (Brause) Rödl-Linder
Goniophlebium dielseanum (C.Chr.) Rödl-Linder
Goniophlebium fieldingianum (Kunze ex Mett.) T.Moore
Goniophlebium formosanum (Baker) Rödl-Linder
Goniophlebium hendersonii Bedd.
Goniophlebium korthalsii Bedd.
Goniophlebium lachnopus (Wall. ex Hook.) J.Sm.
Goniophlebium manmeiense (Christ) Rödl-Linder
Goniophlebium mehipitense (C.Chr.) Parris
Goniophlebium mengtzeense (Christ) G.Roedl-Linder
Goniophlebium percussum (Cav.) W.H.Wagner & Grether
Goniophlebium persicifolium Bedd.
Goniophlebium prainii Bedd.
Goniophlebium pseudoconnatum (Copel.) Copel.
Goniophlebium rajaense (C.Chr.) Parris
Goniophlebium serratifolium Brack.
Goniophlebium someyae (Yatabe) Ebihara
Goniophlebium subamoenum (C.B.Clarke) Bedd.
Goniophlebium subauriculatum (Blume) C.Presl
Goniophlebium terrestre Copel.

References 

Polypodiaceae
Fern genera